Simon Gantillon (7 January 1887 in Lyon – 9 September 1961 in Neuilly-sur-Seine) was a 20th-century French screenwriter and playwright.

Filmography 
 Screenwriter
 1932: Sergeant X by Vladimir Strizhevsky
 1938: Gibraltar by Fedor Ozep
 1939: Personal Column by Robert Siodmak
 1945: Mission spéciale by Maurice de Canonge
 1947: La Figure de proue by Christian Stengel
 1947: Rumours by Jacques Daroy
 1947: Love Around the House by Pierre de Hérain (dialoguist only)
 1947: Lured by Douglas Sirk 
 1949: Maya by Raymond Bernard

Plays 
 1923: Cyclone
 1924: Maya
 1928: Départs
 1931: Bifur
 Mirages
 Fugues
 Iles fortunées

References

External links 

 Simon Gantillon on data.bnf.fr
 

20th-century French screenwriters
20th-century French dramatists and playwrights
1887 births
Writers from Lyon
1961 deaths